The Big 33 Football Classic is an all-star American football game featuring the top high-school football players in Pennsylvania. Played since 1957, the game is often described as the "Super Bowl of High School Football." Contests currently pit players from Pennsylvania against players from Maryland, but opponents in the past have also included players from Ohio and Texas. Recent games have been held at Hersheypark Stadium in Hershey, Pennsylvania.

While the game was originally played with the best 33 players in each state (hence its name), the organizers added a 34th player to give kickers a chance to be separate of the 33 count as to give one more non-kicker a chance to be named to the Big 33. Thus, there are 34 players from each state who are invited to play in this game on the original roster. If there are players that are selected are unable to play, the staff of the team and the Big 33 will select other players to fill their places on the roster.

In 2006 the game was moved from mid-late July to mid-late June due to the NCAA rule changes that made some coaches prohibit many players from these teams from playing in the game due to the closeness of the upcoming summer practices.

In October 2012 it was announced that Pennsylvania had dropped Ohio from the BIG 33 game and replaced them with Maryland.

Game-related activities

A wide variety of activities take place on the weekend of the game, typically in June or July. These activities include cheerleading exhibitions, scholarship presentations, youth clinics, and visits by the players to local hospitals, the Boys & Girls Club and other charities. Over $2 million in academic scholarships have been awarded as a result of the game and its sponsors.  Each team has its own host families who host a player.  The Ohio players arrive in Hershey and meet their host families Friday night (one week and a day before the game) and the Pennsylvania players arrive in Hershey and meet their host families on Saturday at the kickoff picnic that includes the host families and cheerleaders. The players visit hospitals and receive a "Buddy". Many of the players keep ties with their host families while in college and throughout their careers and the event is a very family-like event.

Notable alumni

See also
USA Today All-USA high school football team
Gatorade Player of the Year awards

References

External links
Big 33 website

High school football games in the United States
High school football in Ohio
High school sports in Pennsylvania
American football in Ohio
American football in Pennsylvania
Hershey, Pennsylvania
Recurring sporting events established in 1957